Flintstone is an unincorporated community and census-designated place (CDP) in Allegany County, Maryland, United States. As of the 2010 census it had a population of 177. It is part of the Cumberland, MD-WV Metropolitan Statistical Area.

Flintstone lies between the southern foot of Tussey Mountain and a water gap in Warrior Mountain formed by Flintstone Creek, a tributary of Town Creek, which flows south to the Potomac River. Rocky Gap State Park and Green Ridge State Forest are both in the Flintstone zip code. The Breakneck Road Historic District was listed on the National Register of Historic Places in 1980.

Demographics

References 

Census-designated places in Allegany County, Maryland
Census-designated places in Maryland
Populated places in the Cumberland, MD-WV MSA
Cumberland, MD-WV MSA
Tributaries of the Potomac River